Tracheoides is a genus of moths of the family Noctuidae.

Species
 Tracheoides modesta Prout, 1932
 Tracheoides tamsi Prout, 1926

References
Natural History Museum Lepidoptera genus database
Tracheoides at funet

Hadeninae